Philip Ray Mudrock (born June 12, 1937) is an American former professional baseball player.  Mudrock was a right-handed pitcher who spent a decade (1956–1965) as a professional, but who appeared in only one inning of one Major League game on April 19, 1963.

Originally signed by the New York Yankees, he never rose above the Class A Eastern League as a member of the Yankee farm system, and was acquired by the Chicago Cubs after the 1960 minor league baseball season. He entered the game in relief of starting pitcher Larry Jackson in the eighth inning, with the Cubs trailing 4–0. In his one inning of relief, he surrendered a lead-off double to Jim Davenport and an RBI hit to Willie McCovey. He also committed a balk; at the time, National League umpires were instructed to enforce the balk rule, and an abnormally high number of balk calls were made in the early weeks of the season. (The Giants' starter, Juan Marichal, was also cited in the same game). The Giants eventually won, 5–1.

In the minor leagues, Mudrock compiled a 58–74 won–lost record and a 4.68 earned run average in 241 games.

References

External links
Career record and playing statistics from Baseball Reference

1937 births
Living people
Alexandria Aces players
Baseball players from Colorado
Binghamton Triplets players
Chicago Cubs players
Dallas–Fort Worth Spurs players
Greensboro Yankees players
Houston Buffs players
Kearney Yankees players
Major League Baseball pitchers
McAlester Rockets players
Modesto Reds players
People from Louisville, Colorado
Salt Lake City Bees players